English society comprises the group behaviour of the English people, and of collective social interactions, organisation and political attitudes in England. The social history of England evidences many social and societal changes over the history of England, from Anglo-Saxon England to the contemporary forces upon the Western world. These major social changes have occurred both internally and in its relationship with other nations. The themes of social history include demographic history, labour history and the working class, women's history, family, the history of education in England, rural and agricultural history, urban history and industrialisation.

Prehistoric society
The distant past does not offer much information on the structures of society. However, major changes in human behaviour make it likely that society must have changed dramatically. In common with much of Europe, the switch from the hunter-gatherer lifestyle to farming around 4000 BC must have heralded an enormous shift in all aspects of human life. Nobody knows what changes may have occurred, and recent evidence of permanent buildings and habitation from 3,000 years ago means that these may still have been gradual shifts. One of the most obvious symbols of change in prehistoric society is Stonehenge. The building of such stone circles, burial mounds and monuments throughout the British Isles seems to have required a division of labour. Builders would have needed to dedicate themselves to the task of monument construction to acquire the necessary skills. Not having time to hunt and farm would make them rely on others to such an extent that specialised farmers would emerge who provided not only for themselves but also for the monument builders. There are many changes in culture seen in prehistoric and later times such as the Beaker people, the Celts, the Romans and the Anglo-Saxons.

Romans 

The Roman invasion of Britain in 54 BC probably did not alter society greatly at first, as it was simply a replacement of the ruling class, but numerous, at first minor, ideas would later gain footholds. Certainly, it would not have affected Ireland in the slightest. It is from the Romans, and particularly Tacitus, that we get the earliest detailed written records of Britain and its tribal society. We get fascinating glimpses of society in Britain before the Romans, although only briefly and disparagingly mentioned, particularly the importance of powerful women such as Cartimandua and Boudica. City dwelling was not new to pre-Roman Britain, but it was a lifestyle that the Romans preferred even though available to only a select few Romanised Britons. Romanisation was an important part of the Roman conquest strategy, and British rulers who willingly adopted Roman ways were rewarded as client kings; a good example of this is Togidubnus and his ultramodern Fishbourne Roman Palace. To subdue and control the country, the Romans built a major road network which not only was an important civil engineering project but formed the basis of the country's communication links. The Romans brought many other innovations and ideas such as writing and plumbing, but how many of these things were the preserve of the rich or were even lost and re-appropriated at a later date is uncertain.

Early medieval society 

The collapse of the Western Roman Empire in the 5th century is thought to have brought general strife and anarchy to society, but the actual events are not well understood. Archaeology certainly shows a reduction in the expensive goods found before, and the Roman cities began to be abandoned, but much of British society had never had such things. Certainly, numerous peoples took advantage of the absence of Roman power, but how they affected British society is far from clear. The hegemony of Roman rule gave way to a selection of splintered, often competing, societies, including later the heptarchy. Rather than think of themselves as a small part of a larger Roman empire, they reverted to smaller tribal allegiances.

The Anglo-Saxons' arrival is the most hotly disputed of events, and the extent to which they killed, displaced, or integrated with the existing society is still questioned. What is clear is that a separate Anglo-Saxon society, which would eventually become England with a more Germanic feel, was set up in the south east of the island. These new arrivals had not been conquered by the Romans, but their society was perhaps similar to that of Britain. The main difference was their pagan religion, which the surviving northern areas of non-Saxon rule sought to convert to Christianity. During the 7th century these northern areas, particularly Northumbria, became important sites of learning, with monasteries acting like early schools and intellectuals such as Bede being influential. In the 9th century Alfred the Great worked to promote a literate, educated people and did much to promote the English language, even writing books himself. Alfred and his successors unified and brought stability to most of the south of Britain that would eventually become England.

Late medieval society 

After the Norman conquest of England in 1066, society seemed fixed and unchanging for several centuries, but gradual and significant changes were still taking place, the exact nature of which would not be appreciated until much later. The Norman lords spoke Norman French, and in order to work for them or gain advantage, the English had to use the Anglo-Norman language that developed in England. This became a necessary administrative and literary language (see Anglo-Norman literature), but despite this the English language was not supplanted, and after gaining much in grammar and vocabulary began in turn to replace the language of the rulers. At the same time the population of England more than doubled between Domesday and the end of the 13th century, and this growth was not checked by the almost continual foreign warfare, crusades and occasional civil anarchy.

Feudalism, although historians debate the term, is often used to describe medieval society. Basically stated, a lord owns land or a fief which he allows vassals to work in return for their military service. The vast majority of the people were peasants who would work on the vassal's fiefs. This or a similar system was the basis of later medieval society. It probably existed in some form in England before the Norman conquest, but the Normans did much to institute it, either replacing existing lords or by becoming 'overlords' above now-demoted lords. A wealth of information on these social structures can be drawn from the best early surveys of its type, the Domesday Book.

Church

The Crusades are one measure of the ever-increasing power of the church in medieval life, with some estimates suggesting that as many as 40,000 clergy were ordained during the 13th century. This is also shown by the spate of cathedral building, common throughout Europe, at the time. These great buildings would often take several generations to complete, spawning whole communities of artisans and craftsmen and offering them jobs for life. A quarter of the land was owned by the Church. Its monasteries owned large tracts of land farmed by peasants.

Prosperity and population growth

The two centuries from 1200 to 1400 (when the plague hit) were prosperous. The population grew rapidly, from about 2 million to about 5 million. England remained a mainly rural society, and many agricultural changes, such as crop rotation, kept the countryside profitable. Most people lived by farming, although there were wide variations in patterns of land ownership and the status of peasants. To meet the needs of the growing population more land had to be cultivated. Waste land was exploited and major incursions were made into forests, fen and marsh lands. "High farming" was increasingly practised, whereby the landowner took personal control of his land using hired hands rather than leasing it out. Treatises appeared on the best practices, but the growth of per-acre productivity was small. On good land one acre might produce 17 bushels of wheat (compared to 73 bushels an acre in the 1960s), or 26 of barley or 22 of oats.

After 1300 prosperity was more tenuous owing to a combination of over-population, land shortages and depleted soils.  The loss of life in the Great Famine of 1315–1317 shook the English economy severely, and population growth ceased. The first outbreak of the Black Death in 1348 then killed around half the English population, but left plenty of land for the survivors. The agricultural sector shrank, with higher wages, lower prices and shrinking profits leading to the final demise of the old demesne system and the advent of the modern farming system of cash rents for lands. Wat Tyler's Peasants' Revolt of 1381 shook the older feudal order and limited the levels of royal taxation considerably for a century to come.

Towns
The increase in population led not only to denser rural areas but also to more and larger towns. Many new towns appeared but most were small. Major cities such as Lincoln, Norwich and Thetford had 4,000–5,000 population, while London grew from 10,000 to nearly 40,000 population and York approached 10,000.

The 13th century experienced a mini-industrial revolution, with the increased use of wind power and changes in the wool industry. Wool, always important to the British economy, was traditionally exported to be processed, but it was now frequently processed in England, creating a variety of extra jobs. The export of cloth continued to increase from the 14th century onwards, and after the closing of the port of Calais (which consumed much of the raw wool) by the Spanish in the late 16th century, cloth became the primary type of wool exported. Many people were finding different roles and responsibilities within English society too, with the growth of common law giving people greater access to the law and the "commons" starting to have a place in the Parliament during Edward I of England's time.

Black Death and population decline

After many years of growth and gradual change, there was one seismic event which changed British society dramatically. The Black Death in the middle of the 14th century almost halved the population. Whole villages were wiped out by the plague, but rather than destroying society it managed to reinvigorate it. Before the plague there was a large, probably excessive, workforce with not enough productive work available. Overpopulation meant that before the Black Death too many people were competing for scarce resources. Afterwards, the drop in population meant that labourers were in short supply and were paid better. Peasants who had once been confined to a landowner's estate now had an incentive to travel to areas without workers. This social mobility was combined with the fact that peasants could charge much more for their services, and this began a switch from indentured labourer to wage earner, which signalled the decline of the feudal system.

The peasants' new-found freedoms were very worrying to the authorities, who passed laws specifying the maximum that a peasant should be paid, but this had little effect on wages. The first of several sumptuary laws were also made, dictating exactly how people at every level of society should dress and what they could own, in an effort to enforce social distinctions. These new laws, plus a newly levied poll tax which had been calculated on pre-plague population figures, led directly to the Peasants' Revolt. Although quickly put down, the revolt was an early popular reform movement—a precursor to later, more successful uprisings.

Chaucer's vision
Geofrey Chaucer's Canterbury Tales give an illuminating picture of many of the different people who made up medieval society, although these portraits are limited mainly to the middle classes. The Wife of Bath is one particularly vibrant character within the Tales, and a few years later a real-world equivalent, Margery Kempe, showed in her autobiography that women had an important part in medieval society.

Tudor society 

In general terms, the Tudor dynasty period was seen as relatively stable compared to the previous years of almost constant warfare. However, the Reformation caused internal and external social conflict, with a considerable impact on social structure and personality.

Before they were broken up and sold by Henry VIII, monasteries had been one of the important parts of social welfare, giving alms and looking after the destitute, and their disappearance meant that the state would have to adopt this role, which culminated in the Poor Law of 1601. The monasteries were decrepit and no longer were the major educational or economic establishments in the country. After they had gone, many new grammar schools were founded and these, along with the earlier introduction of the printing press, helped to improve literacy.

Food and agriculture
The agricultural reforms which had begun in the 13th century accelerated in the 16th century, with enclosure altering the open-field system and denying many of the poor access to land. Large areas of land which had once been common, and whose usage had been shared between many people, were now being enclosed by the wealthy mainly for extremely profitable sheep farming.

England's food supply was plentiful throughout most of the era; there were no famines. Bad harvests caused distress, but they were usually localised. The most widespread came in 1555–57 and 1596–98. In the towns the price of staples was fixed by law; in hard times the size of the loaf of bread sold by the baker was smaller.

The poor consumed a diet largely of bread, cheese, milk, and beer, with small portions of meat, fish and vegetables, and occasionally some fruit. Potatoes were just arriving at the end of the period, and became increasingly important. The typical poor farmer sold his best products on the market, keeping the cheap food for the family. Stale bread could be used to make bread puddings, and bread crumbs served to thicken soups, stews, and sauces. At a somewhat higher social level, families ate an enormous variety of meats, especially beef, mutton, veal, lamb, and pork, as well as chickens and ducks. The holiday goose was a special treat. Many rural folk and some townspeople tended a small garden which produced vegetables such as asparagus, cucumbers, spinach, lettuce, beans, cabbage, carrots, leeks, and peas, as well as medicinal and flavoring herbs. Some raised their own apricots, grapes, berries, apples, pears, plums, currants, and cherries.  Families without a garden could trade with their neighbours to obtain vegetables and fruits at low cost. 
 
The people discovered new foods (such as the potato and tomato imported from the Americas), and developed new tastes during the era. The more prosperous enjoyed a wide variety of food and drink, including exotic new drinks such as coffee and chocolate. French and Italian chefs appeared in the country houses and palaces, bringing new standards of food preparation and taste. For example, the English developed a taste for acidic foods—such as oranges for the upper class—and started to use vinegar heavily. The gentry paid increasing attention to their gardens, with new fruits, vegetables and herbs; pasta, pastries, and dried mustard balls first appeared on the table. The apricot was a special treat at fancy banquets. Roast beef remained a staple for those who could afford it. The rest ate a great deal of bread and fish. Every class had a taste for beer and rum.

At the rich end of the scale the manor houses and palaces were awash with large, elaborately prepared meals, usually for many people and often accompanied by entertainment. Often they celebrated religious festivals, weddings, alliances and the whims of her majesty.

17th century

England was wracked by civil war over religious issues. Prosperity generally continued in both rural areas and the growing towns, as well as the great metropolis of London.

The English Civil War was far from just a conflict between two religious faiths, and indeed it had much more to do with divisions within the one Protestant religion. The austere, fundamentalist Puritanism on the one side was opposed to what it saw as the crypto-Catholic decadence of the Anglican church on the other. Divisions also formed along the lines of the common people and the gentry, and between the country and city dwellers. It was a conflict that was bound to disturb all parts of society, and a frequent slogan of the time was "the world turned upside down".

In 1660 the Restoration was a quick transition back to the high-church Stuarts. Public opinion reacted against the puritanism of the Puritans, such as the banning of traditional pastimes of gambling, cockfights, the theatre and even Christmas celebrations. The arrival of Charles II—The Merry Monarch—brought a relief from the warlike and then strict society that people had lived in for several years. The theatre returned, along with expensive fashions such as the periwig and even more expensive commodities from overseas. The British Empire grew rapidly after 1600, and along with wealth returning to the country, expensive luxury items were also appearing. Sugar and coffee from the East Indies, tea from India and slaves (brought from Africa to the sugar colonies, along with some enslaved servants in England itself) formed the backbone of imperial trade.

One in nine Englishmen lived in London near the end of the Stuart period. However, plagues were even more deadly in a crowded city—the only remedy was to move to isolated rural areas, as Isaac Newton of Cambridge University did in 1664–66 as the Great Plague of London killed as many as 100,000 Londoners. The fast-growing metropolis was the centre of politics, high society and business. As a major port and hub of trade, goods from all over were for sale. Coffee houses were becoming the centres of business and social life, and it has also been suggested that tea might have played its own part in making Britain powerful, as the antiseptic qualities of tea allowed people to live closer together, protecting them from germs, and making the Industrial Revolution possible. These products can be considered as beginning the consumer society which promoted trade and brought development and riches to society.

Newspapers were new and soon became important tools of social discourse, and the diarists of the time such as Samuel Pepys and John Evelyn are some of the best sources we have of everyday life in Restoration England. Coffee houses grew numerous and were places for middle-class men to meet, read the papers, look over new books and gossip and share opinions. Thomas Garway operated a coffee house in London from 1657 to 1722. He sold tea, tobacco, snuff, and sandwiches. Businessmen met there informally; the first furs from the Hudson's Bay Company were auctioned there.

The diet of the poor in the 1660–1750 era was largely bread, cheese, milk, and beer, with small quantities of meat and vegetables. The more prosperous enjoyed a wide variety of food and drink, including tea, coffee, and chocolate.

Crime and punishment

Historians examining the period 1300–1800 have detected a high level of continuity in their studies of crime and punishment. They have used local records, as well as literary sources, to explore how crime was defined and detected, the changes in the court system, the central importance of elite attitudes toward the poor and dangerous classes, professional criminals, and the amateur and community element in law enforcement before the establishment of police forces in the 19th century. The Black Act of 1723, sponsored by Robert Walpole, strengthened the criminal code. It specified over 200 capital crimes, many with intensified punishment. Arson, for example, was expanded to include burning or the threat of burning haystacks. The legal rights of defendants were strictly limited. For example, suspects who refused to surrender within 40 days could be summarily judged guilty and sentenced to execution if apprehended. Local villages were punished if they failed to find, prosecute and convict alleged criminals.

From the left, historians such as E. P. Thompson have emphasized that crime and disorder were characteristic responses of the working and lower classes to the oppressions imposed upon them. Thompson argues that crime was defined and punished primarily as an activity that threatened the status, property and interests of the elites. England's lower classes were kept under control by large-scale execution, transportation to the colonies, and imprisonment in horrible hulks of old warships. There was no interest in reformation, the goal being to deter through extremely harsh punishment.

Georgian society

Agriculture
Major advances in farming made agriculture more productive and freed up people to work in industry. The British Agricultural Revolution included innovations in technology such as Jethro Tull's seed drill which allowed greater yields, while the process of enclosure, which had been altering rural society since the Middle Ages, became unstoppable. The new mechanisation needed much larger fields – the layout of the British countryside with the patchwork of fields divided by hedgerows that we see today.

Industrial Revolution
Historians typically date the coming of the Industrial Revolution to Britain in the mid-18th century. Not only did existing cities grow but small market towns such as Manchester, Sheffield and Leeds became cities simply by weight of population.

Middle class and stability
The middle class grew rapidly in the 18th century, especially in the cities. At the top of the scale, the legal profession succeeded first, establishing specialist training and associations, and was soon followed by the medical profession. The merchant class prospered with imperial trade. Wahrman (1992) argues that the new urban elites included two types: the gentlemanly capitalist, who participated in the national society, and the independent bourgeois, who was oriented toward the local community. By the 1790s a self-proclaimed middle class, with a particular sociocultural self-perception, had emerged.

Thanks to increasing national wealth, upward mobility into the middle class, urbanisation, and civic stability, Britain was relatively calm and stable, certainly compared with the revolutions and wars which were convulsing the American colonies, France and other nations at the time. The politics of the French Revolution did not translate directly into British society to spark an equally seismic revolution, nor did the loss of the American Colonies dramatically weaken or disrupt Great Britain.

Religion
Historians have emphasized the importance of religion, including the domination of the Anglican establishment. The Act of Toleration 1689 granted rights of free religious worship to the non-conformist Protestant sects which had emerged during the Civil War. Baptists, Congregationalists, Methodists, and Quakers were all allowed to pray freely. These groups took the opportunity of the expanding empire and set up in the Thirteen Colonies, where they expanded rapidly after the First Great Awakening.

In response to the religious and moral apathy of the common people, Methodist preachers set up societies divided into classes—intimate meetings where individuals were encouraged to confess their sins to one another and to build each other up. They also took part in love feasts which allowed for the sharing of testimony and mutual surveillance of moral behavior. The success of Methodist revivals in reaching the poor and working classes concentrated their attention on spiritual goals rather than political grievances.

Cultural history
Scholars have recently been moving toward cultural history rather than social history. The language and self images of people are the chief targets of cultural studies. Of special importance is the concept of an emerging consumer society. Studies of middle- and upper-class manners, tastes, and fashions have proliferated, along with studies of gender, national, and racial identities.

Victorian era

The social changes during the Victorian era were wide-ranging and fundamental, leaving their mark not only upon the United Kingdom but upon much of the world which was under Britain's influence during the 19th century. It can even be argued that these changes eclipsed the massive shifts in society during the 20th century; certainly many of the developments of the 20th century have their roots in the 19th. The technology of the Industrial Revolution had a great impact on society. Inventions not only introduced new industries for employment, but the products and services produced also altered society.

The population of England almost doubled from 16.8 million in 1851 to 30.5 million in 1901. Scotland's population also rose rapidly, from 2.8 million in 1851 to 4.4 million in 1901. Ireland's population decreased rapidly, from 8.2 million in 1841 to less than 4.5 million in 1901, mostly due to the Great Famine. At the same time, around 15 million emigrants left the United Kingdom in the Victorian era and settled mostly in the United States, Canada, and Australia. Not only did the rapidly expanding British Empire attract immigrants, it also attracted temporary administrators, soldiers, missionaries and businessmen who on their return talked up the Empire as a part of greater Britain.

Culturally there was a transition away from the rationalism of the Georgian period and toward romanticism and mysticism with regard to religion, social values, and the arts. The era is popularly associated with the "Victorian" values of social and sexual restraint.

The status of the poor is one area in which huge changes occurred. A good illustration of the differences between life in the Georgian and Victorian eras are the writings of two of England's greatest authors, Jane Austen and Charles Dickens. Both writers held a fascination for people, society and the details of everyday life but in Austen the poor are almost absent, mainly because they were still the rural poor, remote and almost absent from the minds of the middle classes. For Dickens, only a few years later, the poor were his main subject, as he had partly suffered their fate. The poor now were an unavoidable part of urban society and their existence and plight could not be ignored. Industrialisation made large profits for the entrepreneurs of the times, and their success was in contrast not only to the farm workers who were in competition with imported produce but also to the aristocracy whose landowning wealth was now becoming less significant than business wealth. The British class system created an intricate hierarchy of people which contrasted the new and old rich, the skilled and unskilled, the rural and urban and many more.

Some of the first attacks on industrialisation were the Luddites' destruction of machines, but this had less to do with factory conditions and more to do with machines mass-producing linen much quicker and cheaper than the handmade products of skilled labourers. The army was called to the areas of Luddite activity such as Lancashire and Yorkshire and for a time there were more British soldiers controlling the Luddites than fighting Napoleon in Spain. The squalid, dangerous and oppressive conditions of many of the new Victorian factories and the surrounding communities which rose to service them became important issues of discontent, and the workers began to form trade unions to get their working conditions addressed.

The first unions were feared and distrusted, and ways were devised to ban them. The most widely known case was that of the Tolpuddle Martyrs of 1834, an early attempt at a union whose members were tried on a spurious charge, found guilty and transported to Australia. The sentence was challenged and they were released shortly afterwards, but unions were still threatened. It was not until the formation of the TUC in 1868 and the passing of the Trade Union Act 1871 that union membership became reasonably legitimate. Many pieces of legislation were passed to improve working conditions, including the Ten Hours Act 1847 to reduce working hours, and these culminated in the Factory Act 1901.

Many of these acts resulted from the blight of Britain's agricultural depression.  Beginning in 1873 and lasting until 1896, many farmers and rural workers were hard-pressed for a stable income. With the decline in wheat prices and land productivity many countrymen were left looking for any hope of prosperity. Although the British parliament gave substantial aid to farmers and labourers, many still complained that rents were too high, wages too low, and the hours labourers were required to work were too long for their income. As a result, many workers turned to unions to have their concerns heard and, with the acts listed above as proof, were able to achieve some success.

Environmental and health standards rose throughout the Victorian era; improvements in nutrition may also have played a role, although the importance of this is debated. Sewage works were improved as was the quality of drinking water. With a healthier environment, diseases were caught less easily and did not spread as much. Technology was also improving because the population had more money to spend on medical technology (for example, techniques to prevent death in childbirth so more women and children survived), which also led to a greater number of cures for diseases. However, a cholera epidemic took place in London in 1848–49 killing 14,137, and subsequently in 1853 killing 10,738. This anomaly was attributed to the closure and replacement of cesspits by the modern sewerage systems.

Communications and travel

Communication improved rapidly. Stage coaches, canal boats, steam ships and most notably the railways all speeded up the movement of people, goods and ideas. New communication methods were very fast if not instantaneous, including the telegraph, the telephone and the trans-oceanic cable.

Trains opened up leisure destinations, especially seaside resorts. The Bank Holidays Act 1871 created a number of fixed holidays which the middle class could enjoy.  Large numbers travelling to quiet fishing villages such as Worthing, Brighton, Morecambe and Scarborough began turning them into major tourist centres, and people like Thomas Cook saw arranging for domestic and foreign tourism as a viable business model.  Steam ships such as the SS Great Britain and SS Great Western made international travel more common but also advanced trade, so that in Britain it was not just the luxury goods of earlier times that were imported into the country but essentials such as grain and meat from North America and Australia. One more important innovation in communications was the Penny Black, the first postage stamp, which standardised postage to a flat price regardless of distance sent.

The Victorians were impressed by science and progress, and felt that they could improve society in the same way as they were improving technology. The model town of Saltaire was founded, along with others, as a planned environment with good sanitation and many civic, educational and recreational facilities, although it lacked a pub, which was regarded as a focus of dissent. Similar sanitation reforms, prompted by the Public Health Acts 1848 and 1869, were made in the crowded, dirty streets of the existing cities, and soap was the main product shown in the relatively new phenomenon of advertising. Victorians also strove to improve society through many charities and relief organisations such as the Salvation Army, the RSPCA and the NSPCC, and at the same time there were many people such as Florence Nightingale trying to reform areas of public life. Another new institution was Robert Peel's "peelers", one of the earliest formal police forces.

Women and the family
Reformers organised many movements to obtain greater rights for women; voting rights did not come until the next century. The Married Women's Property Act 1882 meant that women did not lose their right to their own property when they got married and could divorce without fear of poverty, although divorce was frowned upon and very rare during the 19th century. It is too much to claim that the Victorians "invented childhood," but they deemed it the most significant phase of life. The trend was towards smaller families, probably because of the rise of modern inner-directed families, coupled with lower infant mortality rates and longer life spans. Legislation reduced the working hours of children while raising the minimum working age, and the passing of the Education Act 1870 set the basis for universal primary education.

In local government elections, unmarried women ratepayers received the right to vote in the Municipal Franchise Act 1869. This right was confirmed in the Local Government Act 1894 and extended to include some married women. By 1900, more than 1 million women were registered to vote in local government elections in England.

Divorce
In Britain before 1857 wives were under the economic and legal control of their husbands, and divorce was almost impossible. It required a very expensive private act of Parliament costing perhaps £200, of the sort only the richest could possibly afford.  It was very difficult to secure divorce on the grounds of adultery, desertion, or cruelty.  The first key legislative victory came with the Matrimonial Causes Act 1857, which passed over the strenuous opposition of the highly traditional Church of England.  The new law made divorce a civil affair of the courts, rather than a Church matter, with a new civil court in London handling all cases.  The process was still quite expensive, at about £40, but now became feasible for the middle class.  A woman who obtained a judicial separation took the status of a feme sole, with full control of her own civil rights.  Additional amendments came in 1878, which allowed for separations handled by local justices of the peace.  The Church of England blocked further reforms until the final breakthrough came with the Matrimonial Causes Act 1973.

20th century

First World War

Edwardian ideals were a bit more liberal 1901–1914, but what really changed society was the Great War. The army was traditionally never a large employer in the nation, and the regular army stood at 247,000 at the start of the war. By 1918 there were about five million people in the army and the fledgling Royal Air Force, newly formed from the RNAS and the RFC, was about the same size of the pre-war army. The almost three million casualties were known as the "lost generation", and such numbers inevitably left society scarred; but even so, some people felt their sacrifice was little regarded in Britain, with poems like Siegfried Sassoon's Blighters criticising the ill-informed jingoism of the home front. Conscription brought people of many different classes, and also people from all over the empire, together and this mixing was seen as a great leveller which would only accelerate social change after the war.

1920s

The social reforms of the previous century continued into the twentieth with the Labour Party being formed in 1900, but this did not achieve major success until the 1922 general election. Lloyd George said after the World War that "the nation was now in a molten state", and his Housing Act 1919 would lead to affordable council housing which allowed people to move out of Victorian inner-city slums. The slums, though, remained for several more years, with trams being electrified long before many houses. The Representation of the People Act 1918 gave women householders the vote, and in 1928 full equal suffrage was achieved.

After the War, many new food products became available to the typical household, with branded foods advertised for their convenience. The shortage of servants was felt in the kitchen, but now instead of an experience cook spending hours on difficult custards and puddings the ordinary housewife working alone could purchase instant foods in jars, or powders that could be quickly mixed. Breakfast porridge from branded, more finely milled, oats could now be cooked in two minutes, not 20. American-style dry cereals began to challenge the porridge and bacon and eggs of the middle classes, and the bread and margarine of the poor.  Street vendors were fewer. Shops were upgraded; the flies were gone as were the open barrels of biscuits and pickles. Groceries and butcher shops carried more bottled and canned goods as well as fresher meat, fish and vegetables. Whereas wartime shipping shortages had sharply narrowed choices, the 1920s saw many new kinds of foods—especially fruits—imported from around the world, along with better quality, packaging, and hygiene.  Middle classes households now had ice boxes or electric refrigerators, which made for better storage and the convenience of buying in larger quantities.

Great Depression

The relatively prosperous 1920s gave way by 1930 to a depression that was part of a worldwide crisis.

Particularly hardest hit were the north of England and Wales, where unemployment reached 70% in some areas. The General Strike was called during 1926 in support of the miners and their falling wages, but it failed. The strike marked the start of the slow decline of the British coal industry. In 1936 two hundred unemployed men walked from Jarrow to London in a bid to show the plight of the industrial poor, but the Jarrow March, had little impact and it was not until 1940 that industrial prospects improved. George Orwell's book The Road to Wigan Pier gives a bleak overview of the hardships of the time.

People's War: 1939–45

The war was a "people's war" that enlisted every party, class and every region and every interest, with strikingly little dissent. It was started with a "phony war" with little fighting. Fear of bombing led to women and children were moved from London and other cities liable to air raids and evacuated to the country. Most returned some months later and remained in the cities until the end of the war. There were half the number of military casualties in this war than the last, but the improvements in aerial warfare meant that there were many more civilian casualties and a foreign war seemed much closer to home. The early years of the war in which Britain "stood alone" and the Blitz spirit which developed as Britain suffered under aerial bombardment helped pull the nation together after the divisions of the previous decade, and campaigns such as "Dig for Victory" helped give the nation a common purpose. The focus on agriculture to feed the nation gave some people their first introduction to the countryside, and women played an important part in the war effort as the Land Girls.

A half a million women served in the armed forces, led by Princess Elizabeth, the future queen, who donned the ATS soldier's uniform as a lorry driver.

Since 1945

Austerity: 1945–51
The Labour Party victory in 1945 represented pent-up frustrations.  The strong sense that all Britons had joined in a "People's War" and all deserved a reward animated voters.  But the Treasury was near bankruptcy and Labour's nationalization programs were expensive.  Prewar levels of prosperity did not return until the 1950s. It was called the Age of Austerity. The most important reform was the founding of the National Health Service on 5 July 1948. It promised to give cradle to grave care for everyone in the country, regardless of income.

Wartime rationing continued, and was extended to bread. In the war the government banned ice cream and rationed sweets, such as chocolates and confections; sweets were rationed until 1954. Most people grumbled, but for the poorest, rationing was beneficial, because their rationed diet was of greater nutritional value than their pre-war diet. Housewives organized to oppose the austerity. The Conservatives saw their opening and rebuilt their fortunes by attacking socialism, austerity, rationing, and economic controls, and were back in power by 1951.

Prosperous 1950s
As prosperity returned after 1950, Britons became more family centred. Leisure activities became more accessible to more people after the war. Holiday camps, which had first opened in the 1930s, became popular holiday destinations in the 1950s – and people increasingly had money to pursue their personal hobbies. The BBC's early television service was given a major boost in 1953 with the coronation of Elizabeth II, attracting an estimated audience of twenty million, proving an impetus for middle-class people to buy televisions. In 1950 1% owned television sets; by 1965 75% did.  As austerity receded after 1950 and consumer demand kept growing, the Labour Party hurt itself by shunning consumerism as the antithesis of the socialism it demanded.

Small neighbourhood stores were increasingly replaced by chain stores and shopping centres, with their wide variety of goods, smart-advertising, and frequent sales. Cars were becoming a significant part of British life, with city-centre congestion and ribbon developments springing up along many of the major roads. These problems led to the idea of the green belt to protect the countryside, which was at risk from development of new housing units.

1960s
The 1960s saw dramatic shifts in attitudes and values led by youth.  It was a worldwide phenomenon, in which British rock musicians, especially The Beatles, played an international role. The generations divided sharply regarding the new sexual freedom demanded by youth who listened to bands like The Rolling Stones.

Sexual morals changed. One notable event was the publication of D. H. Lawrence's Lady Chatterley's Lover by Penguin Books in 1960. Although first printed in 1928, the release in 1960 of an inexpensive mass-market paperback version prompted a court case. The prosecuting council's question, "Would you want your wife or servants to read this book?" highlighted how far society had changed, and how little some people had noticed. The book was seen as one of the first events in a general relaxation of sexual attitudes. Other elements of the sexual revolution included the development of The Pill, Mary Quant's miniskirt and the 1967 legalisation of homosexuality. There was a rise in the incidence of divorce and abortion, and a resurgence of the women's liberation movement, whose campaigning helped secure the Equal Pay Act and the Sex Discrimination Act in 1975.

The 1960s were a time of greater disregard for the establishment, with a satire boom led by people who were willing to attack their elders. Pop music became a dominant form of expression for the young, and bands like the Beatles and the Rolling Stones were seen as leaders of youth culture. Youth-based subcultures such as the mods, rockers, hippies and skinheads became more visible.

Reforms in education led to the effective elimination of the grammar school. The rise of the comprehensive school was aimed at producing a more egalitarian educational system, and there were ever-increasing numbers of people going into higher education.

In the 1950s and 1960s, immigration of people to the United Kingdom, mainly from former British colonies in the Caribbean, India and Pakistan, began to escalate, leading to racism. Dire predictions were made about the effect of these new arrivals on British society (most famously Enoch Powell's Rivers of Blood speech), and tension led to a few race riots. In the longer term, many people with differing cultures have successfully integrated into the country, and some have risen to high positions.

1980s
One important change during the 1980s was the opportunity given to many to buy their council houses, which resulted in many more people becoming property owners in a stakeholder society. At the same time, Conservative Margaret Thatcher weakened her bitter enemy, the trade unions.

The environmentalism movements of the 1980s reduced the emphasis on intensive farming, and promoted organic farming and conservation of the countryside.

Religious observance declined notably in Britain during the second half of the 20th century, even with the growth of non-Christian religions due to immigration and travel (see Islam in the UK). Church of England attendance has particularly dropped, although charismatic churches like Elim and AOG are growing. The movement to Keep Sunday Special seemed to have lost at the beginning of the 21st century.

1990s and the new millennium 
Following on from the resurgence of economic liberalism in the 1980s, the last decade of the 20th century was noted for a greater embrace of social liberalism within British society, largely attributed to the greater influence of the generation born in the socially transformative 1960s. In 1990, 69% of Britons surveyed believed homosexuality was morally wrong; by the end of the decade this had fallen to below half, and the legal age of consent for homosexual sexual activity had been lowered to 16, in line with heterosexual sex.

The death of Diana, Princess of Wales in 1997 was also observed to have demonstrated the way in which social attitudes towards mourning had changed, with the unprecedented mass public outpourings of grief that characterised the days after her death being remarked upon as reflecting a change in the national psyche.

Growing disparity in the relative affluence of those who have benefitted and those 'left behind' from the deindustrialisation and globalisation of the economy was attributed as one of the primary factors behind the surprise victory of the 'leave' campaign in the 2016 European Union membership referendum, and began wider discourse on the emergence of 'two countries' within England that represented greatly differing social attitudes and outlooks.

Historiography
The social history of the medieval period was primarily developed by Eileen Power, H. S. Bennett, Ambrose Raftis, Rodney Hilton, and Sylvia Thrupp before the rise of the New Social History in the 1960s.

Burchardt (2007) evaluates the state of English rural history and focuses on an "orthodox" school dealing chiefly with the economic history of agriculture. The orthodox historians made "impressive progress" in quantifying and explaining the growth of output and productivity since the agricultural revolution. A challenge came from a dissident tradition that looked chiefly at the negative social costs of agricultural progress, especially enclosure. In the late 20th century there arose a new school, associated with the journal Rural History. Led by Alun Howkins, it links rural Britain to a wider social history. Burchardt calls for a new countryside history, paying more attention to the cultural and representational aspects that shaped 20th-century rural life.

See also
 English people
 Economic history of the United Kingdom, after 1700
 History of women in the United Kingdom
 Political history of the United Kingdom (1945–present)
 Social history of the United Kingdom (1945–present)

References

Further reading
 Bédarida, François. A social history of England, 1851–1990, Routledge, 1991, 
 Bolton, J. L. Mediaeval English Economy, 1150–1500  (2nd ed. 1985) 416 pp

 Britnell, R. H.  Britain and Ireland 1050–1530: Economy and Society (2004)
 
 Daunton, M. J. Progress and Poverty: An Economic and Social History of Britain 1700–1850 (1995)
 Devine, T. M. and Rosalind Mitchison. People and Society in Scotland: A Social History of Modern Scotland: 1760–1830 (1988)
 Glynn, Sean, and Alan Booth. Modern Britain: An Economic and Social History (Routledge, 1996)
 Gregg, Pauline. A Social and Economic History of Britain: 1760–1950 (1950) online
 Harrison, Brian. Seeking a Role: The United Kingdom 1951–1970 (2009, paperback with revisions 2011); online
 Harrison, Brian. Finding a Role? The United Kingdom 1970–1990 (2010, paperback with revisions 2011). online; major scholarly survey
 Hobsbawm, Eric, and George Rudé. Captain Swing (1969)
 Horrox, Rosemary, and W. Mark Ormrod, A Social History of England, 1200–1500 (Cambridge UP, 2006), 
 McKibbin, Ross. Classes and Cultures: England 1918-1951 (1998)  576 pp
 Marr, Andrew. A History of Modern Britain (2009); covers 1945–2005.
 Marr, Andrew. Elizabethans: How Modern Britain Was Forged (2021), covers 1945 to 2020.
 Mathias, Peter. The transformation of England: essays in the economic and social history of England in the eighteenth century (Taylor & Francis, 1979), 
 Mowat, Charles Loch. Britain Between the Wars, 1918–1940 (1955), 690pp;
 Neale, Matt. "Research in urban history: recent theses on crime in the city, 1750–1900." Urban History. (2013) 40#3 pp 567–577. online
 Newman, Gerald, ed. Britain in the Hanoverian Age, 1714-1837: An Encyclopedia (1997)
 Platt; Colin. Medieval England: A Social History and Archaeology from the Conquest to 1600 A.D (1994)
 Porter, Roy. English Society in the Eighteenth Century (2nd ed. 1991)   excerpt
 Royle, Edward. Modern Britain: A Social History 1750–1997 (2nd ed. 1997), with detailed bibliography pp 406–444
 Sharpe, J. A. Early Modern England: A Social History 1550–1760 (2009)
 Stearns, Peter, ed. Encyclopedia of Social History (1994) 856 pp.
 Stearns, Peter, ed. Encyclopedia of European Social History from 1350 to 2000 (5 vol 2000), 209 essays by leading scholars in 3000 pp.
 Thompson, E.P. The Making of the English Working Class (1963)
 Thompson, F. M. L., ed. The Cambridge Social History of Britain, 1750–1950. Vol. 1: Regions and Communities. Vol. 2: People and Their Environment; Vol. 3: Social Agencies and Institutions (1990). 492 pp.

 Youings, Joyce A. The Social History of Britain in the 16th Century (1991)

Medical
 Berridge, Virginia. "Health and Medicine" in F M.L. Thompson, ed., The Cambridge Social History of Britain, 1750–1950, vol. 3, Social Agencies and Institutions, (1990). pp 171–242.

Historiography
 Burchardt, Jeremy. "Agricultural History, Rural History, or Countryside History?" Historical Journal 2007 50(2): 465–481. 
 Hawke, Gary. "Reinterpretations of the Industrial Revolution" in Patrick O'Brien and Roland Quinault, eds. The Industrial Revolution and British Society (1993) pp 54–78.
 Kanner, Barbara. Women in English Social History, 1800–1914: A Guide to Research (2 vol 1988–1990). 871 pp.
 Navickas, Katrina. "What happened to class? New histories of labour and collective action in Britain," Social History, May 2011, Vol. 36 Issue 2, pp 192–204
 Thompson, E. P. The Essential E. P. Thompson (2001). 512 pp. highly influential essays on 19th century working class
 Wilson, Adrian, ed. Rethinking Social History: English Society, 1570–1920 and Its Interpretation (1993). 342 pp.